Todd Alexander Cooper (born 25 June 1983) is a former freestyle and butterfly swimmer who competed at the 2004 Summer Olympics in Athens, Greece. There he finished in 22nd position in the 100-metre butterfly.  Cooper, a member of swimming club Stirling, twice competed for Scotland at the Commonwealth Games, in 2002 and 2006. Formerly coached by Gary Hollywood at the City of Birmingham Swimming Club from 1994 to 1998.

Cooper represented Great Britain at the 2008 Summer Olympics in the 100-metre butterfly swimming event.

References

External links 
British Swimming athlete profile
British Olympic Association athlete profile

1983 births
Living people
English male swimmers
Olympic swimmers of Great Britain
English male freestyle swimmers
Male butterfly swimmers
Swimmers at the 2004 Summer Olympics
Swimmers at the 2008 Summer Olympics
Sportspeople from Kidderminster
European Aquatics Championships medalists in swimming
Commonwealth Games bronze medallists for England
Swimmers at the 2006 Commonwealth Games
Commonwealth Games medallists in swimming
Universiade medalists in swimming
Universiade silver medalists for Great Britain
Medalists at the 2005 Summer Universiade
Medallists at the 2006 Commonwealth Games